Gyaca County, is a county of Shannan located in the south-east of the Tibet Autonomous Region, China.

Gyatsa County is in the south of Tibet, stretching from the Podrang La pass along the southern side of the Brahmaputra River downstream to Pamda which is just to the southwest of Daklha Gampo, across the Brahmaputra. The county capital is in the town of Gyaca or Drumpa ( west of Pamda) which is alongside the Drakpo Dratsang Monastery. It is renowned for its walnuts and apricots.

Lhamo La-tso, the small oval 'Oracle Lake', where senior Tibetan monks go for visions to assist in the discovery of reincarnations of the Dalai Lamas is located in Gyaca County,

Settlements
Gangga
Zhaxigang
Gyaca

Climate

Footnotes

External links
 Gyaca County Annals

 
Counties of Tibet
Shannan, Tibet